Greenough Pond is a  water body located in Coos County in northern New Hampshire, United States, in the township of Wentworth Location. The pond is part of the Androscoggin River watershed.

The lake is classified as a coldwater fishery, with observed species including brook trout and lake trout.

See also

List of lakes in New Hampshire

References

Lakes of Coös County, New Hampshire